Show and Prove is the debut studio album by American rapper Wiz Khalifa. It was released on September 5, 2006, by Rostrum Records. Recording sessions took place from 2005 to 2006, with the production primarily provided from I.D. Labs, alongside other record producers from Nesia Beatz and The Resource; as well as guest appearances from Kev da Hustla and Johnny Juliano, among others.

The album was promoted by a lead single, "Pittsburgh Sound". Upon its release, the album received critical acclaim. To date, the album sold 10,000 copies in the United States.

Singles 
The album was promoted by a lead single, called "Pittsburgh Sound". The track was produced by The Resource.

Track listing 

Notes
 Track 17 includes a hidden track, which appears at the 4:25 mark.
 In some other formats, "Youngin On His Grind / Pittsburgh Sound" were listing as the single track.

References
Ayad, Moustafa (October 5, 2006). "For the Record: 10/5/06". Pittsburgh Post-Gazette. Retrieved on August 4, 2007.
Amen, Rob (March 30, 2007). "South Hills hip-hop artist shows he's got nothing to prove". Pittsburgh Tribune-Review. Retrieved on August 4, 2007.

External links
Show and Prove review on okayplayer.com

2006 debut albums
Wiz Khalifa albums
Rostrum Records albums